Cystic fibrosis-related diabetes (CFRD) is diabetes specifically caused by cystic fibrosis, a genetic condition. Cystic fibrosis related diabetes mellitus (CFRD) develops with age, and the median age at diagnosis is 21 years. It is an example of type 3c diabetes - diabetes that is caused by damage to the pancreas from another disease or condition.

Presentation 
CFRD shares features of both type 1 and type 2 diabetes. CFRD patients are typically young and are not obese, and lack metabolic syndrome features. On the other hand, the cause is not autoimmune, some insulin resistance is present, and ketosis is rare.

Pathophysiology 
The endocrine pancreatic function deterioration appears to be secondary to chronic pancreatitis and subsequent scarring associated with CF.

Epidemiology 
CFRD occurs in some 20% of adolescents and 40–50% of adults affected by CF. Though rare in children, it has been described in CF patients of all ages, including infants. Beginning in the teenage years, CFRD has an annual incidence of ~3%, and may be more common in females. It is associated with more severe CF gene mutation types.

As survival of CF patients has steadily increased in past decades, CFRD is an increasingly common – and currently the most common – complication of CF.

See also 
 Cystic fibrosis

References

External links 

Diabetes
Pulmonology
Endocrinology
Cystic fibrosis